"O What a Savior" is a Southern gospel song penned by the Free Will Baptist musician Marvin P. Dalton in 1948.

Lyrics
Once I was straying in sin's dark valley,
No hope within could I see,
He searched through Heaven, and found a Savior
To save a poor lost soul like me.

O what a Savior, O hallelujah!
His heart was broken on Calvary,
His hands were nail scarred,
His side was riven,
He gave His life-blood for even me.

He left the Father with all His riches,
With calmness sweet and serene,
Came down from Heaven and gave His life-blood,
To make the vilest sinner clean.

O what a Savior, O hallelujah!
His heart was broken on Calvary,
His hands were nail scarred,
His side was riven,
He gave His life-blood for even me.

Death's chilly waters I'll soon be crossing,
His hand will lead me safe o're,
I'll join the chorus in that bright city,
And sing up there forever more.

O what a Savior, O hallelujah!
His heart was broken on Calvary,
His hands were nail scarred,
His side was riven,
He gave His life-blood for even me.

References
 O What a Savior as sung by the Cathedrals
 O What a Savior as sung by Ernie Haase & Signature Sound

Southern gospel songs